Shehab Salem Ali Alawlaqi Ahmed  (born 29 March 1984), is an Emirati association football midfielder who plays for Ajman Club and the UAE national team.

Career in Al Ain FC

Ahmed usually plays as a left midfielder but can also be useful as a winger or as left side back. He sometimes took the set pieces for Al Ain FC. He was also known for his fast flanks down the left side and his accurate crosses which favor the attackers of his team.

He used to be an important player to any coach who trains and used to start the majority of the matches but recently he has been benched due to several injuries that had followed him for almost two seasons.

He is nicknamed "Recoba" by his fans, this is because he shares the same playing style as that of Uruguayan footballer Alvaro Recoba.

After a long absence that lasted for almost two seasons, Shehab made a phenomenal comeback in the Etisalat Emirates Cup competition and scored the winning goal in the finale against Al-Wahda in the 73rd minute which handed Al Ain FC the first Etisalat Emirates Cup.

He left Al Ain in June 2012 to sign with Ajman Club.

Honors

 UAE League Titles: 2002/2003, 2003/2004
 UAE Presidents Cup: 2003/2004, 2004/2005, 2008/2009
 AFC Champions League: 2003
 UAE FA Cup: 2004/2005, 2005/2006
 UAE Super Cup: 2002/2003, 2009/2010
 Reached the Quarter-Final of the 2003 FIFA World Youth Championship with The UAE National Team
Etisalat Emirates Cup : 2008/2009

Trivia

 Scored the opening goal in the UAE match against Panama in the 2003 FIFA World Youth Championship
 Scored a goal in both the semifinal and final of the 2005 AFC Champions League

References

External links

1984 births
Living people
Emirati footballers
Al Ain FC players
Ajman Club players
2004 AFC Asian Cup players
UAE Pro League players
Association football midfielders
United Arab Emirates international footballers